Dischidia ovata (sometimes commonly called watermelon dischidia) is a plant in the genus Dischidia native to New  Guinea and North Queensland. Named scientifically for its ovate leaves, its common name refers to the leaf venation that resembles a watermelon, similarly to unrelated plants like Peperomia argyreia. The species is succulent and grows as an epiphytic or lithophytic vine in a variety of habitats.

References

Dischidia
Plants described in 1843